Shenlha Ökar or Shiwa Ökar is the most important deity in the Yungdrung Bon tradition of Tibet. He is counted among the "Four Transcendent Lords" along with Satrig Ersang (Sherab Chamma), Sangpo Bumtri, and Tonpa Shenrab Miwoche.

Name and Biography
Shenlha Ökar means "wisdom gshen of white light;" the variant Shiwa Okar means "peaceful white light." The Bon term gShen can mean "priest or shaman" or possibly in this case "deity who is a priest." In some accounts he is considered the sambhogakāya form of Tonpa Shenrab Miwoche, the founder of Bon (the nirmāṇakāya aspect). In other accounts, he is visited by Shenrab Miwoche when Miwoche is in a prior incarnation known as Salwa. Additionally, some categorize him as "corresponding exactly to the Buddhist category of dharmakāya."

Shenlha Okar is said to have created the world with the help of nine brother gods or nine cosmic gods who appear as war gods or drala. He is also considered a god of compassion with many parallels to Chenrezig and also with Amitābha.

Depiction
Shenlha Okar is depicted with a white body "like the essence of crystal," holding a hook in his right hand (and sometimes a lasso in his left), and seated in a throne supported by elephants.

Shiwa Okar in the terma of Chögyam Trungpa Rinpoche

Shiwa Okar featured in a work composed by the influential Tibetan Buddhist lama Chögyam Trungpa, particularly a long verse epic composed in Tibet called The Golden Dot: The Epic of the Lha, the Annals of the Kingdom of Shambhala, and in terma he revealed beginning in 1976. The Golden Dot was lost in Trungpa Rinpoche's flight from Tibet in 1959.

Kornman notes that one of the "striking things" about the text is that it refers not to Indic sources but to the "creation myths found in the royal chronicles and in the Epic of Gesar of Ling" and "evoke the cosmology of native Tibetan religion, not Buddhism." His Shambhala terma feature Shiwa Okar as an iṣṭhadevatā "meditational deity", with a tantric retinue of drala and werma

Trungpa Rinpoche's work has antecedents in the edition of the Gesar epic prepared by  Jamgon Ju Mipham Gyatso and ritual practices he composed in conjunction with that work. Kornman notes "Mipham made his edition of the Gesar Epic a hybrid of Buddhist and local ideas. He made sure it would be read in this manner by writing a parallel set of Gesar chants that mix religions in the same way. These ritual practices may be found in the Na chapter of his collected works. In Bon tradition, King Gesar of Ling is sent to Tibet by Shenlha Okar, and Trungpa Rinpoche's blending of native traditions and Indian Buddhism appears to echo Mipham's.

In a "History of Shambhala" composed by Chogyam Trungpa, Shiwa Okar is described as follows:

Notes

See also
Bon
Tonpa Shenrab Miwoche
Shambhala Buddhism
Sipe Gyalmo

Bon deities
Shambhala vision